The bar-bellied woodcreeper (Hylexetastes stresemanni) is a species of bird in the Dendrocolaptinae subfamily.
It is found in humid forest of the western Amazon in northern Bolivia, far western Brazil, eastern Peru, southeastern Colombia, and, as recently confirmed, eastern Ecuador.

References

Hylexetastes
Birds of Peru
Birds of Bolivia
Birds of Ecuador
Birds of the Amazon Basin
Birds described in 1925
Taxa named by Emilie Snethlage
Taxonomy articles created by Polbot